These are the results of the 2014 NACAC Under-23 Championships in Athletics which took place from August 8 to 10 at the Hillside Stadium in Kamloops, British Columbia, Canada.

Men's results

100 meters

Heats – 8 August
Wind: Heat 1: +2.4 m/s, Heat 2: +2.6 m/s

Final – 8 August – Wind: +0.2 m/s

200 meters
Final – 10 August – Wind: +1.5 m/s

400 meters

Heats – 8 August

Final – 9 August

800 meters

Heats – 9 August

Final – 10 August

1500 meters
Final – 8 August

5000 meters
Final – 9 August

10,000 meters
Final – 8 August

3000 meters steeplechase
Final – 10 August

110 meters hurdles
Final – 9 August – Wind: +2.1 m/s

400 meters hurdles
Final – 10 August

High jump
Final – 10 August

Pole vault
Final – 10 August

Long jump
Final – 8 August

Triple jump
Final – 10 August

Shot put
Final – 10 August

Discus throw
Final – 8 August

Hammer throw
Final – 10 August

Javelin throw
Final – 9 August

Decathlon
Final – 10 August

20,000 meters walk
Final – 10 August

4 x 100 meters relay
Final – 9 August

4 x 400 meters relay
Final – 10 August

Women's results

100 meters
Final – 8 August – Wind: +0.2 m/s

200 meters
Final – 10 August – Wind: +0.2 m/s

400 meters
Final – 9 August

800 meters
Final – 10 August

1500 meters
Final – 8 August

5000 meters
Final – 10 August

10,000 meters
Final – 10 August

3000 meters steeplechase
Final – 9 August

100 meters hurdles
Final – 9 August – Wind: +2.2 m/s

400 meters hurdles
Final – 10 August

High jump
Final – 8 August

Pole vault
Final – 9 August

Long jump
Final – 10 August

Triple jump
Final – 9 August

Shot put
Final – 9 August

Discus throw
Final – 8 August

Hammer throw
Final – 8 August

Javelin throw
Final – 10 August

Heptathlon
Final – 10 August

10,000 meters walk
Final – 8 August

4 x 100 meters relay
Final – 9 August

4 x 400 meters relay
Final – 10 August

References

NACAC Under-23 Championships in Athletics
Events at the NACAC Under-23 Championships in Athletics